Ectima is a brush-footed butterfly genus found in South America.

Species 
Listed alphabetically:
Ectima erycinoides (C. & R. Felder, 1867)
Ectima iona (Doubleday, 1848)
Ectima lirides (Staudinger, 1885)
Ectima thecla (Fabricius, 1796)

References

External links 

Biblidinae
Nymphalidae of South America
Nymphalidae genera
Taxa named by Edward Doubleday